Peter Rey Aguilar (born June 19, 1979) is an American politician who has been chair of the House Democratic Caucus since 2023. He has been the U.S. representative for California's 33rd congressional district (renumbered from the 31st after the 2020 redistricting cycle) since 2015. He served as mayor of Redlands, California, from 2010 to 2014, and as the president of the Inland Empire Division of the League of California Cities. Aguilar served on the Redlands City Council from 2006 until his election to Congress.

Aguilar chairs the House Democratic Caucus and is the highest-ranking Latino in Congress.

Early life and education
Aguilar was born in Fontana, California, and grew up in a working-class family in San Bernardino, California. He is of Mexican descent. He graduated from the University of Redlands, where he studied government and business administration.

Career
Aguilar began his career in public service in 2001 when then-California Governor Gray Davis appointed him Deputy Director of the Inland Empire Regional Office of the governor, eventually becoming the Interim Director. In 2006, Aguilar became the youngest member of the Redlands City Council in the city's history when five council members, Democrat and Republican, picked him out of 11 candidates to fill an open seat. He was elected a year later. His fellow council members appointed him mayor in 2010 and again in 2012. As mayor, Aguilar was regarded for his professionalism, leadership during difficult financial times, balancing the city budget while building financial reserves, road improvements, government transparency, and fair treatment of municipal employees. Aguilar served as mayor and councilman until December 2014.

U.S. House of Representatives

Elections
California's 31st congressional district became more favorable to the Democratic Party as a result of redistricting following the 2010 Census. The Cook Partisan Voting Index rates the district D+5. In January 2012, Aguilar announced he would run for the seat held by incumbent Republican Gary Miller. Although the top Democratic vote-getter, with 22.6% of the vote, he finished behind Miller and Robert Dutton, the California State Senate Republican Leader. Because of California's open primary, both Republicans advanced to the November general election. In March 2013, Aguilar announced he would run again. In the June 2014 primary, he finished second, qualifying for the November general election, where he defeated Republican Paul Chabot with 51.4% of the vote. Aguilar defeated Chabot again in the 2016 election with 56.1% of the vote.

In the 2018 primary, Aguilar faced Kaiser Ahmed and Sean Flynn, a Republican economist and aikido artist. Aguilar received 45.96% of the vote to Flynn's 45.45% and Ahmed's 8.59%. In the general election, Aguilar won 58.7% of the vote to Flynn's 41.3%.

Legislation

Aguilar's time in Congress has focused on immigration, job creation, trade practices, gun control, national security, LGBT issues, veteran affairs, drug prevention, student loan debt, and environmental protection. Aguilar has supported legislation to attract individuals in the cybersecurity field to join the military; prevent discrimination against LGBT people by government contractors; provide funding for homeless veterans; and provide funding for research into opioid addiction. He has introduced the Grace Period Alleviation (GPA) Act, which would give college graduates an optional grace period before beginning to repay certain types of loans. With Senator Dianne Feinstein and Representative Paul Cook, Aguilar introduced legislation to protect the habitat along the Santa Ana River. He has vowed to fight the repeal of the Affordable Care Act and to protect women's reproductive rights. In addition, he has worked closely with law enforcement and local, state and federal officials and agencies to help communities recover costs incurred from the emergency response to the 2015 San Bernardino attack, which took place in Aguilar's district, and helped secure additional funding for survivors of the attack.

Immigration
During the Obama Administration, Aguilar supported expanding the Deferred Action for Childhood Arrivals (DACA) program for undocumented children and creating the Deferred Action for Parents of Americans and Lawful Permanent Residents (DAPA) program. He introduced the Academic Success Centers and Education Networks for Dreamers (ASCEND) Act, which would establish grants for college and university programs and services to benefit undocumented students. Aguilar voted in favor of legislation that would effectively halt the resettlement of refugees from Syria and Iraq to the U.S., citing national security concerns, but subsequently criticized President Donald J. Trump's Executive Order as "xenophobic" and said it sent a message of "hate and bigotry to the rest of the world." Aguilar criticized Trump and his staff for citing the 2015 San Bernardino attack in defending the executive order. In 2018, with Representative Will Hurd, Aguilar authored legislation that would provide a path to citizenship for DACA recipients and address border protection concerns.

Job creation
Aguilar released a job-creation initiative for his district that includes cutting taxes on small businesses, investing in infrastructure, expanding job-training programs, expanding Pell Grants, increasing the minimum wage, and equal pay for women. He has introduced a number of bills focusing on small businesses, including legislation to provide tax credits to small businesses for on-the-job training expenses, tax credits for small business for full-time newly hired employees, legislation to make it easier for small businesses to repay loans, and legislation making it easier for small businesses to advertise job openings. Aguilar annually hosts a jobs fair that connects job-seekers with employers in his district. In April 2017, he started a quarterly "Job For a Day" tour where he works throughout the Inland Empire doing jobs such as train conducting for Metrolink, sorting Goodwill donations, and bagging groceries at local markets. The tour's goal is to interact with community members directly and learn about local businesses' daily operations.

In 2017, Aguilar introduced a bill that would provide active-duty service members and reservists access to training for commercial drivers’ licenses granted by the FAST Act. He authored the Active Duty Voluntary Acquisition of Necessary Credentials for Employment (ADVANCE) Act and the OPPORTUNITY (Offering Promising Persons Occupations Relevant To Upholding National Interests For Years) Act, both of which Trump signed into law in 2018. The latter bill connects students of color with the Department of Defense Cyber Scholarship program.

Trade policy
Aguilar introduced the Displaced Jobs Relief Act, which increases authorization of funds for the Trade Adjustment Assistance for Firms program (TAA-F) to help businesses that have been negatively affected by trade. He has urged the United States International Trade Commission to find that imported steel subsidized by Korea, Mexico and Turkey creates unfair competition and hurts steel manufacturers in his district.

Gun control
Aguilar has advocated for reforms to curb gun violence by closing loopholes that terrorists have used to obtain guns and banning assault weapons. After the 2016 Orlando nightclub shooting, Aguilar participated in the 2016 United States House of Representatives sit-in to show support for gun control legislation.

Investigation into the January 6 attack on the Capitol 
On July 1, 2021, Speaker Pelosi appointed eight House members, including Aguilar, to the U.S. House Select Committee to Investigate the January 6th Attack on the United States Capitol. After the announcement, Aguilar said of the committee and its investigation: "We owe them—and we owe the American people—a fair, thorough and evidence-based investigation into what happened that day so that we can ensure it never happens again."

On June 16, 2022, Aguilar and John Wood, an investigative counsel for the Select Committee, led the committee's third televised hearing, focusing on Trump's efforts to pressuring Mike Pence into decertifying the 2020 presidential election. The witnesses were Greg Jacob, Pence's counsel, who told Pence he did not have the authority to decertify the election results, and J. Michael Luttig, a retired conservative judge on the United States Court Of Appeals For The Fourth Circuit, who called Donald Trump and his allies and supporters "a clear and present danger to American democracy."

Committee assignments
Committee on Appropriations
Subcommittee on Energy and Water Development
Subcommittee on Transportation, Housing and Urban Development
 Committee on House Administration
 Subcommittee on Elections
 Select Committee on the January 6 Attack

Caucus memberships
 Vice chair, House Democratic Caucus
 Congressional Hispanic Caucus
 Pro-Choice Caucus
 Congressional LGBTQ+ Equality Caucus
 Latino-Jewish Caucus
 Diabetes Caucus
 Work for Warriors Caucus
 Joint Strike Fighter Caucus
 Veterans Jobs Caucus
 Former Mayors Caucus
 Wine Caucus
 Native American Caucus
 Steel Caucus
 Hunger Caucus
 New Democrat Coalition
Congressional Asian Pacific American Caucus
Climate Solutions Caucus

Aguilar announced his candidacy for vice chair of the Democratic Caucus in September 2018, but lost to Katherine Clark by a vote of 144–90. By a vote of 148–82, he defeated Robin Kelly for the no. 6 spot in the House Democratic Caucus. The position became vacant after Clark decided to run for Assistant Speaker in the House Democratic Caucus.

Campaign finance
Aguilar's top contributors throughout his career have been JStreet PAC, League of Conservation Voters, Credit Union National Association, Matich Corporation, and New World Medical. Since 2011, he has not contributed personally to his own campaign, and relies mostly on individual contributions from community members. He has obtained nearly $5.3 million in contributions from individuals (63.86% of total donations). Top donations are generally from Democrats, but also include lawyers and law firms, Leadership PACs, and labor unions. His total career campaign donations are $8.2 million.

Political positions

Abortion

Aguilar opposed the overturning of Roe v. Wade, calling it a "devastating decision".

Big Tech
In 2022, Aguilar was one of 16 Democrats to vote against the Merger Filing Fee Modernization Act of 2022, an antitrust package that would crack down on corporations' anti-competitive behavior.

Electoral history

2020 • 2018 • 2016 • 2014

2020

2018

2016

2014

Personal life 
Aguilar has lived in Redlands, California, since 1997. He and his wife, Alisha, have two sons.

See also
 List of Hispanic and Latino Americans in the United States Congress

References

External links

Congressman Peter Aguilar official U.S. House website
Pete Aguilar for Congress campaign website 
 
 

|-

|-

|-

|-

1979 births
21st-century American politicians
California city council members
Hispanic and Latino American mayors in California
Hispanic and Latino American members of the United States Congress
Living people
Mayors of places in California
Democratic Party members of the United States House of Representatives from California
People from Redlands, California
Politicians from San Bernardino, California
University of Redlands alumni
American politicians of Mexican descent